Blonsky is an East Slavic language surname. Feminine forms: Blonska (Блонська, Ukrainian), Blonskaya (Блонская, Russian, Belarusian). The surnames Blonsky, Oblonsky, Obolonsky may be derived from various placenames Блонь , Облонь , Оболонь.   According to Vladimir Dal's Explanatory Dictionary,  the terms блонье, oболонье, among other meanings, referred to a kind of  wet meadow by river (in Western parts of the Russian Empire), as well as the surrounds of a town, a suburb; - all originating from the generic meaning of "surrounding"., and it is suggested that the term gave rise to placenames. "Blonsky" may also be the Russified form of the Polish surname Błoński of similar origin.

Notable people with the surname include:

Lyudmyla Blonska, Ukrainian athlete
 Nikki Blonsky (born 1988), American actress and singer
 Pavel Petrovich Blonsky (1884–1941), Soviet psychologist 
Seraphima Blonskaya (1870-1947),  Russian artist and art teacher.  

Fictional character:
 Emil Blonsky (a.k.a. The Abomination), a fictional supervillain and enemy of The Incredible Hulk

See also

References

Russian-language surnames
Ukrainian-language surnames

ru:Блонский